Sweden held a general election around 19 September 1924. This was the second election under universal suffrage. In spite of a majority for the non-socialist parties, Social Democrat Hjalmar Branting was able to form a government, although his successor eventually saw the government fall and being replaced by a right-leaning Electoral League government.

Results

Regional results

Percentage share

By votes

Constituency results
The blocs have been listed with "left" as the socialist parties, whereas the "right" were the non-socialist parties, although bloc politics were not as clear as later in the century.

Percentage share

By votes

Results by city and district

Blekinge

Gothenburg and Bohuslän

Bohuslän

Gothenburg

Gotland

Gävleborg

Halland

Jämtland
The two Communist Parties ran on a joint list, having their votes reported separately only at a final vote tally.

Jönköping

Kalmar

Kopparberg

Kristianstad

Kronoberg

Malmöhus

Malmö area

Malmöhus County
The Höglund Communists got nine votes in Skytt Hundred, but have not been listed since they gained no votes elsewhere.

Norrbotten

Skaraborg
The two Communist Parties ran under a joint list, although neither won a seat. At a district level, the results were reported as one unit for those parties.

Stockholm

Stockholm (city)

Stockholm County

Södermanland

Uppsala

Värmland

Västerbotten

Västernorrland

Västmanland
The two Communist Parties ran on a joint list, although their overall constituency results were reported separately.

Älvsborg

Älvsborg N

Älvsborg S

Örebro

Östergötland

References

General elections in Sweden